Tusculum University is a private Presbyterian university with its main campus in Tusculum, Tennessee. It is Tennessee's first university and the 28th-oldest operating college or university in the United States.

In addition to its main campus, the institution maintains a regional center for Adult and Online Studies in Knoxville, and Morristown.

History
Before Tennessee became a state in 1796, the east Tennessee area was the southwestern frontier of the United States. Presbyterian ministers Hezekiah Balch and Samuel Doak, both educated at the College of New Jersey (now Princeton University), were there, ministering to early Scots-Irish settlers.

Striving to meet the settlers' educational needs, Doak founded Martin Academy in 1783, which was expanded to become Washington College in 1795. Washington College was briefly merged in the 20th century with Tusculum College. Balch was the first president of Greeneville College in 1794.

In 1806, emancipated slave John Gloucester became the first African-American student to study at Greeneville College. He was the first African-American educated by a college in Tennessee and later helped found the First African Presbyterian Church in 1807, in Philadelphia.

Samuel Doak and Hezekiah Balch sought the same goals through their separate colleges. They wanted to educate settlers of the American frontier so that they would become better Presbyterians, and therefore, in their thinking, better citizens.  To better accomplish the common goals of each institution, Greeneville College and Tusculum College merged in 1868 to become Greeneville & Tusculum College.

Origin of name
Samuel Doak left Washington College and founded Tusculum Academy, on the present campus of Tusculum University, in 1818 with his son, Samuel Witherspoon Doak. S.W. Doak was named after Princeton University's then-president Dr. John Witherspoon, a signer of the United States Declaration of Independence and Tusculum Academy was named after Witherspoon's estate at the College of New Jersey (Princeton). The original Tusculum was a city near Rome, Italy, and home to Roman scholar and philosopher Cicero. It was he who, along with others, identified the civic virtues that form the basis of civic republican tradition, which emphasizes citizens working together to form good societies that in turn foster individuals of good character.

Presidents
Greeneville College (1794–1868)
Hezekiah Balch, D.D. 1794–1810
 Charles Coffin, D.D. 1810–27
 Henry Hoss 1828–36
 Alfred Hoss 1836–38
 James McLin, B.A. 1838–40
 Samuel Matthews 1843–45
 Charles Van Vlech 1845–46
 John Fleming 1846–47
 William B. Rankin, D.D. 1854–58
 John Lampson 1859–60
Tusculum Academy (1818–68)
 Samuel Doak, D.D. 1818–29
 Samuel Witherspoon Doak, D.D. 1829–44
Tusculum College (1844–68)
 Samuel Witherspoon Doak, D.D. 1844–64
 William Stephenson Doak, D.D. 1865–68
Greeneville and Tusculum College (G&T) (1868–1908)
 William Stephenson Doak, D.D. (1868–82)
 Alexander M. Doak (acting) 1882–83
 Jeremiah Moore, D.D. 1883–1901
 Samuel A. Coile, D.D. 1901–07
Washington and Tusculum College (W&T) (1908–1912)
 Charles O. Gray, D.D. 1907–12Tusculum College (1912–2018) Charles O. Gray, D.D. 1912–31
 Charles A. Anderson, D.D. 1931–42
 John McSween, D.D. 1942–44
 Jere A. Moore (acting) 1944–46
 George K. Davies, Ph.D. 1946–50
 Leslie K. Patton (acting) 1950–51
 Raymond C. Rankin, D.D. 1951–65
 Douglas C. Trout, Ph.D. 1965–68
 Charles J. Ping (acting) 1968–69
 Andrew N. Cothran, Ph.D. 1969–72
 Thomas G. Voss, Ph.D. 1972–78
 Earl R. Mezoff, Ed.D. 1978–88
 Robert E. Knott, Ph.D. 1989–2000
 Thomas J. Garland (interim) 2000
 Dolphus E. Henry III, Ph.D. 2000–07
 Russell L. Nichols, Ph.D. (interim) August 2007–April 2009
 Nancy B. Moody, DSN April 2009 – 2017
 James L. Hurley, Ed.D. 2017–2019Tusculum University (2018–present)' James L. Hurley, Ed.D. 2017–2019
 Greg Nelson, Ph.D. (acting) 2019–2020
 Scott Hummel, Ph.D. 2020–present

Academics

Tusculum is accredited by the Southern Association of Colleges and Schools to award associate, baccalaureate and Master degrees.

It also maintains institutional memberships with the American Council on Education, the Council of Independent Colleges, the Association of American Colleges and Universities, the Council for Higher Education Accreditation, the Council for Opportunity in Education,  the Tennessee Independent Colleges and Universities Association, the Tennessee State Board of Education, the Appalachian College Association, the Association of Presbyterian Colleges and Universities, the American Association of University Women, the American Medical Association, and the New York State Board of Regents.

Athletics

Tusculum athletic teams are nicknamed as the Pioneers. The university is a member of the Division II level of the National Collegiate Athletic Association (NCAA), primarily competing in the South Atlantic Conference since the 1998–99 academic year.

Tusculum fields 24 recognized varsity sports teams: Men's sports include baseball, basketball, bowling, cross country, cheerleading, football, golf, lacrosse, soccer, tennis, track & field and volleyball; while women's sports include basketball, beach volleyball, bowling, cross country, cheerleading, golf, lacrosse, soccer, softball, tennis, track & field and volleyball.

Although most of those sponsored sports compete in NCAA D-II in the SAC, two teams compete as de facto NCAA Division I members. In women's bowling, a sport added in 2019–20 in which the NCAA holds a single championship open to members of all three NCAA divisions, the Pioneers are single-sport members of the Conference Carolinas. Also added for 2019–20 was men's volleyball, in which the NCAA holds a combined Division I/II national championship; the Pioneers compete in that sport as an independent. Tusculum also added the non-NCAA sport of men's bowling in 2019–20, and also recognizes its cheerleaders (both male and female) as varsity athletes.

In 2004, Ricardo Colclough, a defensive back and kick returner, became the first Tusculum Pioneers football player to be drafted by the National Football League when he was selected in the second draft round by the Pittsburgh Steelers. Colclough, the only Tusculum player to appear in an NFL game, played for the Carolina Panthers. He was dismissed from the team in August 2008.

In 2007, former Tusculum College basketball player, Tyler White, became a member of the Washington Generals, the exhibition team that travels with and plays against the Harlem Globetrotters.

In August 2009, Chris Poore, another former Tusculum College basketball player, also became a member of the Washington Generals.

On September 4, 2014, the Tusculum football team hosted the College of Faith, an online institution in Charlotte, North Carolina. In a 71–0 win, the Pioneers set two NCAA all Division records: fewest total yards allowed (minus-100) and fewest rushing yards allowed (minus-124). Tusculum also had three safeties, which tied a Division II record.

Notable alumni

 Stu Aberdeen (1935–1979), American college men's basketball coach; head coach, Marshall University
 Alexander Outlaw Anderson (1794–1869), United States senator from Tennessee; later served in the California State Senate and on the California Supreme Court
 William Coleman Anderson (1853–1902), U.S. Representative from Tennessee
 DeAundre Alford (b. 1997), defensive back for the Atlanta Falcons of the National Football League
 Jacob Franklin Bird (1827–1866), member of Indiana General Assembly
 James D. Black (1849–1938), Governor of Kentucky in 1919
 Vincent Boreing (1839–1903), U.S. Representative from Kentucky
 Roe Campbell (1900–1988), Football and Basketball player for the University of Tennessee, member of Tusculum College's Sports Hall of Fame
 Robert Looney Caruthers (1800–1882), judge, politician, U.S. Representative from Tennessee 
 Ricardo Colclough (b. 1982), cornerback in the National Football League
 Steve Crane (b. 1972), former English football player
 Brandon Dickson (b. 1984), Major League Baseball pitcher for the St. Louis Cardinals
 Henry Dircks (1806–1873) (Honorary degree, 1868), English engineer who is considered to have been the main designer of the projection technique known as Pepper's ghost in 1858
 James Dobson (1920-1987) Broadway, film and television actor
 Andrew Silas Newton Dobson (1840–1918), medical doctor, member of the Tennessee House of Representatives
 Thomas Barger Einstein (1856–1935), Postmaster, politician, member of Virginia House of Representatives
 Cyrus Fees (b. 1982), mixed martial arts/pro wrestling TV announcer
 John Frederick Fulbeck (1916–2011), prominent poet and professor of comparative literature at the California State Polytechnic University, Pomona
 John Harvey Girdner (1856–1933), Prominent New York surgeon who attended President James Garfield after Garfield was shot in 1881; inventor of a "telephonic bullet probe" that came into use before the first x-rays and a pioneer in skin grafting; author of Newyorkitis
 Cho Gyeong-chul (1929–2010), South Korean astronomer who worked at NASA and the US Naval Observatory
 Newton Hacker (1836–1922), attorney, judge, member of Tennessee House of Representatives
 Joan B. Hague (b. 1929), member of the New York State Assembly from 1979 to 1982
 Allen A. Hall (1804–1867), prominent newspaper editor who served as Chargé d' Affaires to Venezuela and then United States Ambassador to Bolivia (Minister Resident) from 1863 to 1867
 David B. Hawk (b. 1968), member of the Tennessee House of Representatives
 Thomas Gray Hull (1926–2008), United States district judge, legal counsel to Governor Lamar Alexander of Tennessee from 1979 to 1981
 Spencer Jarnagin (1792–1853), United States senator from Tennessee from 1843 to 1847
 Anup Kaphle Nepalese journalist; executive editor, Rest of World; previously worked for The Atlantic, The Washington Post, Buzzfeed News and led The Kathmandu Post as editor-in-chief
 Tommy Kilby (b. 1964), member of the Tennessee Senate
 Richard Kollmar (1910–1971), Actor, television personality, stage producer and director
 Pryor Lea (1794–1879), U.S. Representative from Tennessee
 Marianne W. Lewis (b. 1967), academic; Dean, Carl H. Lindner College of Business, the University of Cincinnati; previously, dean, Cass Business School in London, England
 Oscar Lovette (1871–1934), U.S. Representative from Tennessee
 William McFarland (1821–1900), U.S. Representative from Tennessee
 Robert J. McKinney (1803–1875), member of the Tennessee Constitutional Assembly of 1834, justice on the Supreme Court of Tennessee
 Samuel Milligan (1814–1874), Justice of the Tennessee Supreme Court and a Judge of the Court of Claims
 Diana da Costa Neves (b. 1987) (attended, transferred to Vanguard University), Australian-Portuguese professional basketball player
 Park Overall (b. 1957), actress and 2012 Democratic candidate for United States Senate seat held by Bob Corker
 David Trotter Patterson (1818–1891), judge, United States senator from Tennessee 
 Lucas Paulini (b. 1989, Buenos Aires, Argentina), former professional soccer player in the United States
 Charles Ready (1802–1878), lawyer, member of Tennessee House of Representatives, member of the United States House of Representatives
 William Brown Reese (1793–1860), President, University of Tennessee, from 1850 to 1853; justice on Tennessee Supreme Court
 Harry L. Sears (1920–2002), member of the New Jersey Senate
 Eddie Smith (b. 1979), politician, former member of Tennessee House of Representatives, current member of Tennessee Public Charter School Commission
 George Caldwell Taylor (1885–1952), federal judge on the U.S. District Court for the Eastern District of Tennessee
 Oliver Perry Temple (1820–1907) (attended, two years), attorney, author, judge, and economic promoter in East Tennessee in the latter half of the 19th century
 Dave Tollett, head baseball coach of Florida Gulf Coast
 John White (Kentucky politician) (1802–1845), 15th Speaker of the United States House of Representatives, member of Kentucky House of Representatives
 John Henry Wilson (1846–1923), U.S. Representative from Kentucky
 Elijah Fish Yeager (1844–1890), newspaper editor, academic, member of Texas Legislature

Notable faculty
 Millar Burrows (1889–1980), American biblical scholar, leading authority on Dead Sea Scrolls 
 Michael Taylor (glass artist) (b.1944), Prominent artist known for geometric fused glass sculptures 

 Notes 

 References 

Further reading
Allen, Ortha B. (1970). The philosophy of the library-college and its applications to Tusculum College (thesis). Johnson City, TN: East Tennessee State University. (OCLC 25212791)
Bailey, Gilbert L. (1965). A history of Tusculum College, 1944-1964 (thesis). Johnson City, TN: East Tennessee State University.
Hearn, Steven B. (1983). Survival strategies for Tusculum College: An ethnographic evaluation of enrollment, student recruitment, and school image (thesis). Knoxville, TN: University of Tennessee – Knoxville. (OCLC 9939082)
Patrick, James (2007). The beginning of collegiate education west of the Appalachians, 1795-1833: The achievement of Dr. Charles Coffin of Greeneville College and East Tennessee College. Lewiston, New York: Edwin Mellen Press
Ragan, Allen E. (1945). A history of Tusculum College, 1794-1944. Greeneville, TN: The Tusculum Sesquicentennial Committee. 
Treadway, Cleo C. (1974). Reclassification: The Tusculum way''. Greeneville, TN: Tusculum College Press. (OCLC 6922139)

External links

Official website
Official athletics website

 
Education in Greene County, Tennessee
Private universities and colleges in Tennessee
Universities and colleges affiliated with the Presbyterian Church (USA)
Presbyterianism in Tennessee
Educational institutions established in 1794
Universities and colleges accredited by the Southern Association of Colleges and Schools
Buildings and structures in Greene County, Tennessee
Tusculum, Tennessee
Historic districts on the National Register of Historic Places in Tennessee
1794 establishments in the Southwest Territory
National Register of Historic Places in Greene County, Tennessee